The 1995 Ivy League Baseball Championship Series took place at Yale Field in New Haven, Connecticut, on May 6, 1995.  The series matched the regular season champions of each of the league's two divisions.  , the winner of the series, claimed their first title and the Ivy League's automatic berth in the 1995 NCAA Division I baseball tournament.  It was Penn's second consecutive, and second overall appearance in the Championship Series.

Yale made their third consecutive appearance in the Championship Series, winning the first two events in 1993 and 1994.

Results

References

Ivy League Baseball Championship Series
Ivy League Baseball Championship Series
Ivy League Championship Series